Priscilla "Scilla" Studd (née Livingstone Stewart; 28 August 1864 – 15 January 1929) was a British Christian missionary and wife of Charles Studd.

Life and career
Born in Belfast, Ireland, (modern-day Northern Ireland) Priscilla Stewart arrived in Shanghai in 1887 as part of The Hundred missionaries of the China Inland Mission and was one of a large party to arrive together. She was reported as being both Irish in her looks and in her spirit with blue eyes and golden hair. After a while in Shanghai she moved with three other women to work inland at the city of Ta-Ku-Tang.

Of her new-found calling she said,

In China, after praying whilst kneeling in the snow, she became seriously ill with a serious bout of pneumonia - so much so that she sent for her then fiancé Charles - who was himself recovering from an attack of pleurisy. After a while she started to recover but the local Chinese said that having sent for Charles from so far - that they must marry and Charles agreed! They went through a wedding ceremony with Pastor Xi Shengmo - who was unlicensed - but it pleased the locals. After their wedding the Studds moved to another inland city - Lungang-Fu.

Priscilla Studd was married to the English cricketer and missionary Charles Studd whom she met in China when she was a missionary with the China Inland Mission as had Charles as one of the Cambridge Seven under the direction of Hudson Taylor. The Studds were married in 1888 and had four daughters - Grace, Dorothy, Edith, Pauline; in addition two sons died in infancy.

In 1894 the couple returned to England and then between 1900 and 1906 they moved to India. After India and another return to England Charles' missionary work took him alone to Africa and the last sixteen years of their married life was spent apart, with Charles remaining in Africa and Priscilla in England – here she laboured with the newly formed Worldwide Evangelization Crusade. She died in 1929.

See also
 The Studd Brothers
 Kynaston Studd
 George Studd
 Peter Malden Studd
 List of China Inland Mission missionaries in China
 19th-century Protestant missions in China
 Christianity in China

References

External sources
C.T. Studd: Cricketer and Pioneer by Norman Grubb, 
Christian Biography Resources

External links

1864 births
1929 deaths
Protestant missionaries in China
Irish Protestant missionaries
Clergy from Belfast
Female Christian missionaries
British Protestant missionaries
British expatriates in China